"Akou Sopa" is a song recorded by Greek Cypriot singer Ivi Adamou. It is a cover of the Spanish song "Un Bonito Final" originally by Los Rebujitos. The song was written by Los Rebujitos member Yerai Blanco García with Sunny Baltzi and Michalis Kouinelis writing the Greek lyrics for Adamou's version. It was digitally released on 18 July 2016 through the iTunes Store.

"Akou Sopa" received critical acclaim from critics, who praised the song's melodic sounds and also compared it with the original version. Its accompanying music video was directed by Dimitris Sylvestros and premiered along with the song on 17 July 2016.

Background and release 
Adamou announced the release of a new song through her Facebook page on 11 July 2016, when she posted part of the single's artwork with the caption "18/07... #newsong". The teaser of both the song and its accompanying music video were leaked the same day. The full artwork of the song was unveiled on 12 July 2016, with the title of the song and the teaser being revealed as well. The song and its music video were premiered on 17 July 2016 with Adamou posting it on her Facebook page.

Critical reception 
The song received mostly positive feedback from reviewers. Padraig Muldoon of Eurovision blog Wiwibloggs said that the song shows a more vulnerable side of the singer, compared to her Eurovision entry and that "[Adamou] manages to make the track her own, bringing a fresh interpretation with different levels of light and dark". Kiki Vasiliadou of Energy Radio described the song as one of the "most melodic and interesting [song] we've heard lately". Lamianow's Dimitra Yiotidou described the song as "travelling, melodic and sensitive".

Music video 
The song's accompanying music video was shot in June 2016 and was directed by Dimitris Sylvestros, who also was in charge for the direction of the music video of Adamou's previous single, "Tipota De Mas Stamata". The teaser of the music video was first seen on 11 July 2016, after it was leaked. The music video premiered on 17 July 2016 and shows Adamou alone in a room through day and night, winter and summer.

Credits and personnel 

 Ivi Adamou – lead vocals
 Michalis Kouinelis – writer
 Sunny Baltzi – writer
 Eloy Perez – producer
 Marcel Van Gennip – drums
 Robin Freyer – bass guitar
 Marko Katier – guitar, electric guitar, programming, arrangement
 Jairo Blanco – guitar
 Gijs Brouwer – percussion
 Agustin Henke – percussion
 Sanne Spijkers – keyboard
 Aitor Garcia – arrangement
 Lara Sanson – violin
 Alvaro Larrañaga – programming

Release history

References 

2016 singles
2016 songs
Ivi Adamou songs
Songs written by Michalis Kouinelis
Minos EMI singles